Mohamed Saïd Amokrane (born 25 January 1957) is an Algerian footballer. He played in four matches for the Algeria national football team in 1982. He was also named in Algeria's squad for the 1982 African Cup of Nations tournament.

References

External links
 

1957 births
Living people
Algerian footballers
Algeria international footballers
1982 African Cup of Nations players
Association football forwards
21st-century Algerian people
NA Hussein Dey players